This is a list of people who have been awarded the title prima ballerina, the second highest title that can be awarded to a ballerina. 

"Prima ballerina literally translates to “first principal dancer” from Italian and, in the United States, is better known as someone who is a female principal dancer. These dancers are the best in their companies who perform the lead roles in ballets, along with their male counterparts".

List of prima ballerinas

See also
 Prima ballerina assoluta
 List of dancers
 List of female dancers
 Women in dance

References

 Prima ballerinas, List of
Lists of female dancers
Ballet-related lists